If This Bass Could Only Talk is a 1988 album by American bass player Stanley Clarke.

Track listing

Personnel
 Stanley Clarke – double bass, bass guitar, acoustic and electric guitar, keyboards
 Wayne Shorter – soprano saxophone (on 2)
 George Howard – soprano saxophone (on 8)
 Freddie Hubbard – trumpet (on 5)
 Allan Holdsworth – guitar (on 4)
 George Duke – piano (on 8)
 Vance Taylor – piano (on 5)
 Eddie Arkin – synthesizer (on 2)
 Steve Hunt – synthesizer (on 6, 7)
 Byron Lee Miller – synthesizer bass (on 5)
 Gregory Hines – tap dancer (on 1, 9)
 Jimmy Earl – bass (on 6, 7)
 Gerry Brown – drums (on 2, 6, 7)
 Stewart Copeland – drums (on 4)
 Leon "Ndugu" Chancler - drums (on 5)
 John Robinson – drums (on 3, 8)
 Paulinho da Costa – percussion (on 5)

Production
 Chris Cuffaro  – Photography	
 Nancy Donald  – Art Direction	
 Joe Gastwirt  – Engineer	
 Mitch Gibson  – Engineer	
 Bernie Grundman  – Mastering	
 Mick Guzauski  – Mixing	
 Dan Humann  – Engineer	
 Tony Lane  – Art Direction	
 Csaba Petocz  – Engineer	
 Steve Sykes  – Engineer

References

1988 albums
Stanley Clarke albums
Portrait Records albums
Albums produced by Stanley Clarke